The Kurash competition at the 2009 Asian Martial Arts Games took place from 6 August to 8 August at the Thai-Japan Youth Center.

Medalists

Men

Women

Medal table

Results

Men

60 kg
8 August

66 kg
8 August

73 kg
8 August

81 kg
7 August

90 kg
7 August

100 kg
6 August

+100 kg
6 August

Women

48 kg
6 August

52 kg
6 August

57 kg
7 August

63 kg
7 August

70 kg
7 August

78 kg
8 August

+78 kg
8 August

References
 Official website – Kurash

2009 Asian Martial Arts Games events
2009